Sam B. Strother (June 16, 1871 – January 19, 1929) was the mayor of Kansas City, Missouri from January to May 1922.

Early life
Sam B. Strother was born on June 16, 1871, near Louisville, Kentucky. His family moved to Lee's Summit, Missouri, shortly after his birth. He attended local schools and Kansas City High School. He graduated from the law department of the University of Missouri in Columbia in 1893.

Career
After graduating, Strother became the private secretary of Mayor William S. Cowherd. After Cowherd left office, Strother joined the law office of Teasdale, Ingraham & Cowherd. He then formed his own law firm. He was a lawyer and "public administrator" of Jackson County in 1903.

Strother succeeded James Cowgill as mayor after he died in office. He served from January to May 1922.

Personal life
Strother married Maud Davenport of Lee's Summit. They had at least one child, Isabelle. His residence was at 5825 Central Street.

Strother died on January 19, 1929, at the Research Hospital in Kansas City as a result of appendicitis and gall stones. He was also suffering from post-operative pneumonia and myocarditis.

References

External links

1871 births
1929 deaths
University of Missouri alumni
Mayors of Kansas City, Missouri
People from Lee's Summit, Missouri
Politicians from Louisville, Kentucky